Nicolò Nardini (1678–1697) was a Roman Catholic prelate who served as Bishop of Acquapendente (1696–1697).

Biography
Nicolò Nardini was born in Capranica, Lazio, Italy and ordained a priest on 26 December 1678. On 21 May 1696, he was appointed during the papacy of Pope Innocent XI as Bishop of Acquapendente. On 21 May 1696, he was consecrated bishop by Bandino Panciatici, Cardinal-Priest of San Pancrazio, with Prospero Bottini, Titular Archbishop of Myra, and Sperello Sperelli, Bishop of Terni, serving as co-consecrators.  He served as Bishop of Acquapendente until his death in July 1697.

References

External links and additional sources
 (for Chronology of Bishops) 
 (for Chronology of Bishops)  

17th-century Italian Roman Catholic bishops
Bishops appointed by Pope Innocent XI
1636 births
1697 deaths